Max Wolf Valerio (born February 16, 1957, in Heidelberg, West Germany) is an American poet, memoir writer, essayist and actor. He has lived for many years in San Francisco, California.

Valerio described his transition and experiences as a trans man in the 2006 memoir The Testosterone Files. He also writes and performs poetry, and has acted in films and appeared in many documentaries.

Early life
Valerio identifies his mother as being of Blackfoot descent, specifically from the Kainai in Alberta, Canada. Valerio's father is Spanish. Valerio has researched his heritage and inferred that his paternal ancestors were crypto-Jews who had become conversos but secretly handed on Sephardic Jewish traditions.

Valerio's father was in the United States Army for 20 years, which caused them to move frequently in the United States and Europe. Max was born in a US Army hospital in Heidelberg, Germany. Valerio lived in many US states including Maryland, Washington, California, Kansas, Oklahoma, and Colorado, as well as in Canada, and again in Germany as a child and teenager.

Growing up Valerio had a hard time relating to girls. He felt that he did not fit in because of his masculine nature and at times would offer to play male roles, which went unapproved by the girls that he was attempting to play with. Valerio imagined himself as a boy when growing up and could not imagine himself growing into a woman. He felt he was always male and identified with male children/adults. Valerio would cry himself to sleep as a child wishing to be a boy. He decided to identify himself as a lesbian as a teen because it made the most sense to him at the time. He came out as a lesbian feminist in college in 1975. Valerio could not relate to lesbian sex. Valerio started to feel more male and a male gender identity started to come back from childhood.

In 1988, after discussions with a friend and roommate who was formally transitioning from male to female, Valerio realized that he was transsexual and began considering a sex change. Max found the FTM Organization in San Francisco run by Lou Sullivan and started attending meetings. Valerio was amazed by the other female to male trans people and shifted his identity from that of a lesbian to a trans man.

Transition
Valerio transitioned in 1989 from female to male. Valerio's initial exposure to transsexual information were two pieces that have been considered by LGBTQ groups as being exceptionally transphobic. The first book Valerio picked up was Female-to-Male Transsexualism by Leslie Lothstein. Valerio says in The Testosterone Files that "Lothstein's book is damning" and that he "paints the transsexual men he is working with as psychopathic, borderline, fractured, pathetic". Valerio also says that Lothstein's book says that Lothstein "feels that most of the men are mistaken in asking for sex reassignment". The second resource Valerio picked up was Janice Raymond's book The Transsexual Empire. Valerio states that "Raymond postulated that all transsexuals were dupes of the patriarchy, 'mutilating' their bodies in order to live out stereotyped sex roles instead of changing those roles through rigorously applied program of radical feminism".

Valerio talks about his first steps of transitioning in the movie "MAX with Max W. Valerio", a short documentary-style film by Monika Treut. Max goes into deeper depth about the testosterone side of transitioning and early steps in his book The Testosterone Files. He also appears in Gendernauts, another film by Monika Treut.

In his writing, Valerio describes the counselling he received, his experiences with hormone therapy, and the physical changes he observed.

The Testosterone Files
Valerio's memoir The Testosterone Files  describes the psychological, physiological, and social transformation that occurred in the first five years of his transition from female to male. One of the main themes of the book is the role of testosterone in his transition. The book is organized into three parts: "Beginning," "Before Testosterone," and "After Testosterone."

In the prologue, Valerio uses an in-depth narration of what it is like to be a transsexual to allow his readers to understand the trials and tribulations that one experiences when going through a sex change. Valerio says that transsexuals are not simply just a branch of lesbian or gay. He asserts that "transsexual identities must be defined and expressed on our own terms". In Valerio's opinion, transsexuals voices and experiences, until more recently, are "unheard and incompletely imagined".

The first section, "Beginning", describes Valerio as he begins his transition from female to male. Valerio discusses the physical changes occurring that have allowed him to understand what it feels like to experience biological masculinity. These include physical changes such as his voice becoming deeper and his hair becoming darker and coarser.

The second section, "Before Testosterone", shows what led Valerio to decide that changing sex was the right path for him. Valerio describes the cultural and ethnic backgrounds of his mother and father. He says that one of his relationships led him to discover that being a lesbian and sex between two women did not arouse him. He discovered that his attraction towards women wasn't a lesbian attraction, but rather a heterosexual attraction, one from a man to a woman.

The third section, "After Testosterone", is one written so that the readers can feel Valerio's emotional, social, and perceptual transformation from female to male. The beginning chapters of this section narrates Valerio's acceptance of becoming a male. His body is physically transitioning and he is adapting to doing and experiencing ‘male’ things such as shaving, adapting to a deeper voice, and having straight women make advances toward him  He also discusses the emotional experiences of telling everyone who didn't yet already know that he was becoming a male. He describes an in detail encounter of coming out as transsexual to one of his female co-workers as a way to narrate the difficulty of identity politics when transitioning  With this woman, Valerio experienced his first intimate encounter with a female since transitioning to becoming a man. Valerio narrates his perceptual experiences of not yet having bottom surgery, but being physically male otherwise  The book ends off with his discovery of his Adam's apple that has grown from the testosterone which signifies his excitement and recognition that this transition was exactly what Max needed to be happy with himself.

Max Valerio had an increase in energy almost immediately, and increase in sex drive as well an inability to cry as he once had as a female.

In the film MAX, Valerio talks about his experience of perceptual, emotional and physical change with testosterone. Filmed in New York City in the early 1990s, the film is a groundbreaking exploration of trans male experience.

Political views
When Valerio identified himself as a lesbian, he was able to learn about the idea of feminism, became involved with left-wing radical politics and was able to have a deeper understanding of the female identity. Valerio was a part of the American Indian Movement and participated in marches and visited the Pine Ridge Reservation when it was under siege by the F.B.I after the Wounded Knee Occupation. Valerio's political transformation was from left-wing radical and then to the Democratic Party, and eventually to more libertarian/classic liberal. He identifies as a classic liberal.

Works
The Criminal: The Invisibility of Parallel Forces] (Poetry, 2019)
The Testosterone Files: My social and hormonal transition from female to male (Memoir, 2006)
This Bridge We Call Home (Anthology, 2002)
The Phallus Palace (Anthology, 2002)
Male Lust (Anthology, 2000)
This Bridge Called My Back (Anthology, 1981 [pre-transition])
 "Troubling the Line: Trans and Genderqueer Poetry and Poetics" (Poetry Anthology, 2013)
 "Animal Magnetism" (chapbook of poems, 1984 [pre-transition])

Filmography
 Max (Documentary, 1992)
 Female Misbehavior feature-length film featuring the short film: "Max" (Documentary, 1992)
 You Don't Know Dick: Courageous Hearts of Transsexual Men (Documentary, 1997)
 Gendernauts: A Journey Through Shifting (Documentary, 1999)
 Unhung Heroes (Film, 2002)
 Octopus Alarm (Documentary, 2005)
 Straight White Male (Documentary, 2011)
 Framing Agnes (2022)

Notes

External links
 
"About the Authors." (Summer, 2003) blithe house quarterly
 "Max Wolf Valerio." (January 16, 2006) The Other Voices International Project.
 
 Rage Against the Machine

1957 births
American essayists
American memoirists
American male poets
American people of Blackfoot descent
American LGBT poets
Living people
Transgender men
American male essayists
Transgender Jews
Jewish American writers
American people of Sephardic-Jewish descent
Transgender memoirists
21st-century American Jews
American transgender writers